Beach pizza is a style of pizza popular in the coastal communities of New England north of Boston, particularly in northeastern Massachusetts and coastal New Hampshire. It has a very thin crust and is rectangular, being typically cooked on a baking sheet. The crust is topped with a noticeably sweet tomato sauce, a sprinkling of cheddar cheese, and, traditionally, can include slices of provolone cheese (usually the delicatessen form typically used in sandwiches).

History 

Beach pizza was invented in 1944 at Tripoli Bakery in Lawrence, Massachusetts, a mill city along the Merrimack River in the Merrimack Valley, approximately twenty miles west of the Atlantic Ocean. It was popularized during the touristic heyday of Salisbury Beach, Massachusetts in the mid-to-late twentieth century.

References 

Pizza
Pizza
1944 introductions